The Guyana women's national football team is controlled by the Guyana Football Federation. Although the former British colony is located in South America, it competes in CONCACAF.

Team image

Nicknames
The Guyana women's national football team has been known or nicknamed as the "Lady Jags".

Home stadium
Guyana play its home matches on the Providence National Stadium.

Results and fixtures

The following is a list of match results in the last 12 months, as well as any future matches that have been scheduled.

Legend

2021

2022

Players

Current squad
The following players were called up for the match against Trinidad and Tobago on 12 April 2022.

Recent call ups

Previous squads
CONCACAF W Championship
2010 CONCACAF Women's World Cup Qualifying squad

Competitive record

FIFA Women's World Cup

*Draws include knockout matches decided on penalty kicks.

Olympic Games

*Draws include knockout matches decided on penalty kicks.

CONCACAF W Championship

*Draws include knockout matches decided on penalty kicks.

References

External links
 Guyana Football Federation
 FIFA profile

 
South American women's national association football teams
Caribbean women's national association football teams